Pancalia leuwenhoekella is a moth in the family Cosmopterigidae.

Subspecies
Subspecies include:
Pancalia leuwenhoekella leuwenhoekella
Pancalia leuwenhoekella japonica Riedl, 1973 (Japan: Honshu)
Pancalia leuwenhoekella mandshuricella Sinev, 1985 (Russian Far East)

Distribution and habitat
This species is present in nearly all of Europe. In the east, the range extends to Asia Minor, the Caucasus, south-western Siberia and the Russian Far East. Pancalia leuwenhoekella  prefers chalk and limestone habitats.

Description

Pancalia leuwenhoekella has a wingspan of 10–12 mm. The head and thorax are dark bronzy-metallic. Antennae usually with white subapical band. Forewings are deep orange, margins more or less blackish; a narrow interrupted fascia at 1/4, a costal spot before middle and another inwardly oblique at 3/4, a dorsal median spot and an erect tornal mark pale golden-metallic, blackish-edged ; a whitish spot in cilia on posterior costal spot. Hindwings are rather dark bronzy-fuscous. This species is very similar to Pancalia schwarzella .

Biology
The larva is dull purple - reddish, segmental incisions and wrinkles pale brownish-ochreous ; head pale yellowish-brown, darker-marked ; plate of 2 transparent. Adults are on wing from April to June.

The larvae feed on Viola species, including Viola tricolor, Viola hirta and Viola canina. They initially mine the leaf stem of their host plant. In this stage, frass is ejected out of the mine through a hole. Later, the larvae feed on the bast fibre of the subterranean parts of the plant from within a silken tunnel. Pupation takes place in a cocoon made of silk and covered with sand.

Bibliography
Bradley, J.D.Checklist of Lepidoptera Recorded from The British Isles, Second Edition (Revised) (2000)
C. Koster, S. Yu. Sinev: Momphidae, Batrachedridae, Stathmopodidae, Agonoxenidae, Cosmopterigidae, Chrysopeleiidae. In: P. Huemer, O. Karsholt, L. Lyneborg (Hrsg.): Microlepidoptera of Europe. 1. Auflage. Band 5. Apollo Books, Stenstrup 2003, ISBN 87-88757-66-8, S. 93
Emmet, A.M., Langmaid, J.R. (Eds.)The Moths and Butterflies of Great Britain and Ireland, Volume 4 (Part 1) (2002)

External links
 Lepiforum 
 Funet - Markku Savela's Lepidoptera and some other life forms

References

Moths described in 1761
Antequerinae
Moths of Europe
Moths of Asia
Taxa named by Carl Linnaeus